Limnocottus pallidus is a species of ray-finned fish belonging to the family Cottidae, the typical sculpins. This species is endemic to Lake Baikal in Russia. It dwells at a depth range of 150–1000 metres. Males can reach a total length of 13.1 centimetres and females 14.6 cm. L. pallidus can weigh up to 16 grams, and live up to 12 years.

References

pallidus
Fish described in 1948
Fish of Lake Baikal
Taxa named by Dmitrii Nikolaevich Taliev